Colepiocephale (meaning "knucklehead") is a genus of pachycephalosaurid dinosaur from Late Cretaceous (middle Campanian stage) deposits of Alberta, Canada. It was collected from the Foremost Formation (middle Campanian, 80–77.5 ma). The type species, C. lambei, was originally described by Sternberg (in 1945 as Stegoceras lambei), and later renamed by Sullivan in 2003. C. lambei is a domed pachycephalosaur characterized principally by the lack of a lateral and posteriosquamosal shelf, a steeply down-turned parietal, and the presence of two incipient nodes tucked under the posterior margin of the parietosquamosal border.

See also

 Timeline of pachycephalosaur research

References

Late Cretaceous dinosaurs of North America
Fossil taxa described in 2003
Pachycephalosaurs
Paleontology in Alberta
Campanian genus first appearances
Campanian genus extinctions
Ornithischian genera